Save the Queen may refer to:

God Save the Queen, the British and Commonwealth National Anthem
The name of a powerful sword, whip, or bow in Final Fantasy
The name of Raphael's ultimate weapon in Soulcalibur II